Jonel Scott (born January 5, 1992 in Gros Islet, Saint Lucia), is a 6' 8" basketball player. He emigrated to the United States of America in 2009 where he played basketball at Boys and Girls High School in Brooklyn, New York. He was a member of the ESPN Rise National team, 2011.

He then played center in Wildcats, the basketball program of State University of New York Institute of Technology (SUNYIT) in UticaRome where Scott majored in Computer Engineering Technology.

References

1992 births
Living people
Saint Lucian sportsmen
Saint Lucian emigrants to the United States
People from Gros Islet Quarter